The Journal of Oral and Maxillofacial Surgery is a peer-reviewed medical journal that publishes original research in oral and maxillofacial surgery, oral pathology, and other related topics. It is published monthly by Elsevier on behalf of the American Association of Oral and Maxillofacial Surgeons.  The current editor-in-chief is James R. Hupp, DMD, MD, JD, MBA, and associate editor is Thomas Dodson, DMD, MPH.

Another journal is Oral and Maxillofacial Surgery published by Springer, started at 1997.

References

External links 

 

Dentistry journals
Surgery journals
Monthly journals
Elsevier academic journals
English-language journals
Publications established in 1943